Shake, Rattle and Rock! is a 1994 television film starring Renée Zellweger, Howie Mandel, and members of the Grammy-nominated R&B band For Real. The film was produced by Lou Arkoff (son of B movie producer Samuel Z. Arkoff) as part of the Rebel Highway series of television films made in a short-lived revival of American International Pictures that aired on the Showtime television network.

Cast

Soundtrack
 "The Girl Can't Help It" – Little Richard
 "Ain't That a Shame – Fats Domino
 "C'mon Everybody – Eddie Cochran
 "Blue Moon" – For Real
 "Do You Wanna Dance?" – For Real
 "She Put the Bomp" – For Real
 "Look In My Eyes" – For Real
 "All Around the World" – For Real and Julianna Raye
 "Every Night" – The Robins
 "Since I First Met You" – The Robins
 "Lonely Teenager" – Julianna Raye
 "You Oughta Know Me Better" – Julianna Raye

References

External links
 

1994 television films
1994 films
American television films
1990s English-language films
Rebel Highway
Films directed by Allan Arkush
Remakes of American films
1990s musical films
Films produced by Debra Hill